Grand Etang Pubnico Water Aerodrome  is located adjacent to Lower West Pubnico, Nova Scotia, Canada.

References

Registered aerodromes in Nova Scotia
Seaplane bases in Nova Scotia